Jama Zehi (also Romanized as Jamā Zehī; also known as Jamāzī, Jomāzī, and Jommāzī) is a village in Polan Rural District, Polan District, Chabahar County, Sistan and Baluchestan Province, Iran. At the 2006 census, its population was 60, in 14 families.

References 

Populated places in Chabahar County